Shoutin' in Key is a live album by American blues artist Taj Mahal.

Track listing
 "Honky Tonk" (Billy Butler, Bill Doggett, Clifford Scott, Shep Shepherd) – 6:19
 "EZ Rider" (Taj Mahal) – 3:20
 "Ain't That a Lot of Love" (Homer Banks, Willa Dean Parker) – 3:10 
 "Ev'ry Wind (In the River)" (Parker B. Dollaghan, Richard G. Feldman, Mahal) – 5:14
 "Stranger in My Own Hometown" (Percy Mayfield) – 2:55
 "Woulda Coulda Shoulda" (Mahal) – 3:43
 "Leaving Trunk" (John Estes) – 6:06
 "Rain from the Sky" (Delroy Wilson) – 3:28
 "Mailbox Blues" (Mahal) – 3:49
 "Cruisin'" (Johnny Lee Schell, Mahal, Tony Braunagel) –3:47
 "Corrina" (traditional, arr. Mahal, Jesse Ed Davis) – 3:44
 "Hoochi Coochie Coo" (Hank Ballard, Billy Myles) – 3:39
 "Sentidos Dulce" (Mahal) – 6:26

Personnel
Taj Mahal – lead vocals, guitar, harmonica, resonator guitar, percussion

Phantom Blues Band
Tony Braunagel – drums, background vocals, producer
Denny Freeman – guitar
Larry Fulcher – bass, background vocals
Darrell Leonard – trumpet, trombone, flugelhorn
Joe Sublett – saxophones
Mick Weaver – Hammond B3 organ, piano

Production
Terry Becker – live recording engineer
Steve Bigas – second engineer
Joe McGrath – post-production engineer, mixing
Carey Williams – MC

Recorded at The Mint, Los Angeles, November 9—11, 1998.

References

2000 live albums
Taj Mahal (musician) live albums